Santa Spirito is a Roman Catholic church located on Via Don Giovanni Fenizi #6 in the town of Cingoli, province of Macerata, region of Marche, Italy.

History
The church was built originally in 1364 with an adjacent monastery. It was rebuilt in the 18th century in its present state. The interior has gilded stucco. The altarpieces have been moved to the Pinacoteca Comunale of Cingoli.

References

14th-century Roman Catholic church buildings in Italy
Churches completed in 1364
Roman Catholic churches in Cingoli